Benjamin John Plunket was a 20th-century Anglican bishop in Ireland.

Plunket was the son of William Plunket, 4th Baron Plunket, and Anne Lee Guinness (sister of the Lord Ardilaun). Born in Bray on 1 August 1870, he was educated at the Harrow School and Corpus Christi College, Cambridge. Ordained in 1896, he began his career with a curacy at St Peter's Phibsboro. He was then Rector of Aghade with Ardoyne and subsequently Vicar of St Ann's, Dublin. In 1913 he became Bishop of Tuam, Killala and Achonry, and in 1919 was translated to Bishop of Meath. He retired in 1925, and died on 26 January 1947.

The Irish Times, when reporting his death, characterised Plunket as ‘a Churchman of broad views … [who] was not afraid to utter his opinions’. Probably his most notable stand was in 1910 when, on the accession of King George V, parliament passed an act to delete terms offensive to Roman Catholics from the Royal Accession Declaration. The old Declaration, introduced in 1678, repudiated the Mass, transubstantiation and the invocation of the Virgin Mary and the saints. The modified form of the Declaration was widely opposed, but Plunket was the principal promoter of a petition to the House of Commons in support of it, signed by over 3,000 representative Irish Protestants. On another occasion, he was one of three Church of Ireland bishops who, with eighteen Catholic bishops, signed a controversial anti-partition manifesto issued before the Longford by-election of May 1917; the manifesto was a significant factor in Sinn Féin's narrow victory in the by-election. Plunket was also an Irish language enthusiast, encouraging Irish in Church of Ireland schools and hymns in Irish at church services. In 1925, while still Bishop of Meath, he was severely criticised by W.B. Yeats in the latter's famous speech in the Senate on divorce. Plunket's uncompromising approach to sexual morality and the indissolubility of marriage had, as Yeats saw it, given succour to those intent on passing legislation which the Protestant minority would find oppressive. Shortly afterwards, he resigned as Bishop of Meath on health grounds when aged 55.

He was left the St. Anne's Park estate in Raheny in Dublin, formerly the residence of his uncle Lord Ardilaun, following the death of Lady Ardilaun, in 1937 due to the cost of the estate he sold it to Dublin Corporation, keeping Sybil Hill and 30 acres as his residence, his former residence is now St. Paul's College, Raheny.

In 1900 he married Dorothea Hester Butler (1874-1936), the daughter of Sir Thomas Butler, 10th Bt. Their daughter Olive married Peter Wentworth-Fitzwilliam, 8th Earl Fitzwilliam in 1933.

References

External links
 

People from Bray, County Wicklow
People educated at Harrow School
People from Raheny
Alumni of Corpus Christi College, Cambridge
20th-century Anglican bishops in Ireland
Bishops of Tuam, Killala, and Achonry
Anglican bishops of Meath
Younger sons of barons
1870 births
1947 deaths